William Avery may refer to:

 William Avery (Massachusetts politician), a signatory of the Dedham Covenant
 Bill Avery (born 1942), Nebraska politician and professor
 William Avery (aviator) (died 1942), who piloted glider aircraft of Octave Chanute
 William Avery (basketball) (born 1979), American professional basketball player
 William Avery, co-founder of W & T Avery Ltd.
 Sir William Beilby Avery (1854–1908), philatelist, son of William Avery, and senior partner of W & T Avery Ltd.
 William H. Avery (politician) (1911–2009), governor of Kansas
 William H. Avery (engineer) (1912–2004), American aeronautics engineer
 William Tecumsah Avery (1819–1880), former member of the United States House of Representatives
 William Waightstill Avery (1816–1864), member of the Congress of the Confederate States from North Carolina
 William B. Avery (1840–1894), American soldier and Medal of Honor recipient